Joseph Thomas Sarsfield Stopford (26 August 1866 – 25 November 1951) was a British archer.  He competed at the 1908 Summer Olympics in London. Stopford entered the men's double York round event in 1908, taking 12th place with 530 points.

References

External links
 
 
 Joseph Stopford's profile at Sports Reference.com

1866 births
1951 deaths
Archers at the 1908 Summer Olympics
Olympic archers of Great Britain
British male archers